Kraushaar is a German surname, composed of two words: "kraus" meaning crinkly and "haar" meaning hair. Notable people with the surname include:

Bob Kraushaar, English record producer
Elmar Kraushaar (born 1950), German journalist
Karina Kraushaar (1971–2015), German actress
Otto Kraushaar (1812–1866), German musician, writer and composer
Otto Kraushaar (1901–1989), American academic 
Raoul Kraushaar (1908–2001), American composer
Wolfgang Kraushaar (born 1948), German political scientist and historian

See also
Silke Kraushaar-Pielach, German luger

German-language surnames
Surnames from nicknames
de:Kraushaar